The 1994 Recopa Sudamericana was the sixth Recopa Sudamericana, an annual football match between the winners of the previous season's Copa Libertadores and Supercopa Sudamericana competitions. This year's edition pitted the defending champions São Paulo against compatriots Botafogo in a second, consecutive all-Brazilian final. Since São Paulo won both the 1993 Copa Libertadores and 1993 Supercopa Sudamericana, CONMEBOL invited Botafogo, winners of the 1993 Copa CONMEBOL, to participate in order to make this year's Recopa doable. 

São Paulo successfully defends the trophy as they defeated Botafogo 3-1 in Kobe Universiade Memorial Stadium of Kobe to become the first ever team to win consecutive titles. Juan Escobar Valdez became the first referee to direct two finals of the competition (having already done so in 1992).

Qualified teams

Match details

References

Rec
Recopa Sudamericana
Recopa Sudamericana 1994
Recopa Sudamericana 1994
Recopa Sudamericana
Rec
1994